Big Sand Lake Airport  is located  south of Big Sand Lake, Manitoba, Canada.

References

External links
 Page about this airport on COPA's Places to Fly airport directory

Registered aerodromes in Manitoba